Asus EeeBox PC (formerly Asus Eee Box) is a nettop computer line from ASUSTeK Computer Incorporated, and a part of the Asus Eee product family. First released on August 11, 2008, the Asus EeeBox PC series is marketed as a small, light, inexpensive and energy-efficient counterpart to the Asus Eee PC netbook / subnotebook laptop series. Its motherboard employs Splashtop technology called Express Gate by Asus.

Features

"Instant-On"
The EeeBox PC motherboard features a form of embedded Linux, referred to in the user manual as Express Gate, a result of the ASUS SplashTop software. In the EeeBox PC implementation, the user is presented with a customised Linux desktop a few seconds after powering up the EeeBox PC, with the option of launching a web browser, an online chat application, a file manager, a photo browser or a Skype application, without having to load the main operating system.
If the user does not select any of these options, the main operating system (typically Windows XP Home) loads automatically.

Low power consumption

The EeeBox PC uses an external power supply, but due to the low power requirements, this unit is physically smaller than most external computer laptop power supplies. At December 2008, the supplied UK power adapter is a small rectangular "in-line" block measuring approximately 30 mm × 35 mm wide, and around 90 mm long (not including cable stress relief grommets).

"Zero footprint" option
As of December 2008, the EeeBox PC comes with two mounting options, a desktop stand, and a monitor mounting.
The monitor mounting option consists of a heavy plate with mounting holes designed to fit to the VESA 100 or VESA 75 mount area found on the back of many flat-screen monitors. When mounted on the back of a monitor, the EeeBox PC does not require any desk space. With the addition of a compatible USB "TV tuner" dongle the EeeBox PC can be used as a digital television adapter, and add both TV reception and recording facilities to a flat computer monitor.

Robustness
The EeeBox PC hard drive has a hidden recovery partition containing an image of the factory OS installation. This allows the EeeBox PC's operating system to be reset to its initial factory state without the need for any external media or optical disc hardware (although conventional recovery discs are also included).
The permanently embedded Linux system also guarantees a working graphical user interface and a certain degree of functionality (such as web browsing) even without a separate functioning operating system; on most computer systems, the only embedded functionality in this situation would be a very limited set of menu-driven BIOS commands.

Models

See also
 Asus Eee Top – a PC integrated in a touchscreen monitor 
 Asus Eee PC – netbooks
 Acer AspireRevo
 Dell Studio Hybrid
 Mac Mini
 MSI Wind PC

References

External links
Official product page

EeeBox PC
Nettop